Hardgrave is a surname. Notable people with the surname include:

Arthur Hardgrave ( 1908–14), New Zealand rugby league player 
Eric Hardgrave (born 1960), American baseball player
Gary Hardgrave (born 1960), Australian politician
John Hardgrave (1826–1906), Australian politician
John Hardgrave (MP), 16th-century English politician